Highwayman is the thirty-fifth album by American singer/guitarist Glen Campbell, released in 1979 (see 1979 in music).

Track listing

Side 1:

 "Highwayman" (Jimmy Webb) – 3:01
 "Hound Dog Man" (Tommy Stuart) – 2:39
 "I Was Just Thinking About You" (Micheal Smotherman) – 2:40
 "Love Song" (Webb) – 3:15
 "My Prayer" (Smotherman) – 2:37
 
Side 2:

 "Tennessee Home" (Smotherman) – 3:10
 "Don't Lose Me in the Confusion" (T.J. Kuenster) – 3:13
 "Cajun Caper" (Smotherman) – 3:52
 "Darlin' Darlinka" (Smotherman) – 3:16
 "Fool Ya" (Smotherman) – 2:17

Personnel

Glen Campbell – vocals, acoustic guitars, electric guitars, bass guitars
Craig Fall – acoustic guitar, backing vocals
Ed Greene – drums
Carl Jackson – acoustic guitar, fiddle, banjo, backing vocals
TJ Kuenster – keyboards, backing vocals
Bill McCubbin – bass guitar, backing vocals
Steve Turner – drums, backing vocals
Doug Kershaw – fiddle solo on "Cajun Caper"
Tom Kellock – piano on "Hound Dog Man"
Jimmy Webb – piano on "Love Song"
Micheal Smotherman, Dan Kuenster, Laura Turner, Steve Crossley, Kathy Smotherman, Jo Dell Smotherman, Darlene Groncki - additional backing vocals

Production
Producer – Glen Campbell, Tom Thacker
"Highwayman", "Hound Dog Man", "Love Song", "Darlin' Darlinka", "Fool Ya" recorded at Lagniappe, Sherman Oaks, California
"I Was Just Thinkin About You", "Tennessee", "Don't Lose Me in the Confusion", "Cajun Caper" recorded at Broad Recording Studios, Honolulu, Hawaii
"My Prayer" recorded at Capitol Records, Hollywood, California
Arranged by Jimmy Webb, TJ Kuenster
Strings conductor – Sid Sharp, Irving Geller

Charts
Singles – Billboard (United States)

References

Glen Campbell albums
1979 albums
Albums arranged by Jimmy Webb
Capitol Records albums
Albums recorded at Capitol Studios